D. H. Holmes was a New Orleans department store and later a New Orleans-based chain of department stores. The company was founded in 1842 by Daniel Henry Holmes, after whom it is named. In 1849 he moved his headquarters to Canal Street, where he developed his first department store. He followed the model of pioneering department stores in Paris and New York City to offer his customers the best products and services.

D.H. Holmes's main building on Canal Street was long considered a landmark. By the end of the 19th century, it was the largest department store in the South, with customers being served by more than 700 employees. Meeting under its clock, located on the Canal Street facade, was a popular rendezvous when this part of the city was a major shopping area. In the first scene of the Pulitzer Prize-winning novel, A Confederacy of Dunces by John Kennedy Toole, the character Ignatius Reilly agrees to meet his mother at the clock.  

In 1989 D.H. Holmes was purchased by Dillard's, one of numerous mergers among retail stores. 

The former main store of D.H. Holmes was redeveloped as a boutique hotel and opened in 1995 as the Chateau Sonesta Hotel. It completed a major renovation of all guest rooms, lobby, swimming pool, bar, and meeting spaces in May 2012, and is now the Hyatt French Quarter Hotel, managed by HRI Lodging.

See also
Maison Blanche
Dillard's

Notes

External links

 D.H. Holmes lost a U.S. Supreme Court case on use tax in 1988
D.H. Holmes toy department, about 1930

Defunct department stores based in Louisiana
Retail companies established in 1842

History of New Orleans
Companies based in New Orleans
Retail companies disestablished in 1989